The 1992 NCAA Division I Outdoor Track and Field Championships were contested June 3−6, 1992 at Mike A. Myers Stadium at the University of Texas at Austin in Austin, Texas in order to determine the individual and team national champions of men's and women's collegiate Division I outdoor track and field events in the United States. 

These were the 70th annual men's championships and the 11th annual women's championships. This was the Longhorns' fifth time hosting the event and the first since 1985 (the last and only other time Arkansas had won the men's title before 1992).

Arkansas and LSU topped the men's and women's team standings, respectively; it was the Razorbacks' second men's team title and the sixth for the Lady Tigers. This was Arkansas' first title since 1985 and was the first of eight consecutive titles for the Razorbacks. The Lady Tigers, meanwhile, captured their sixth consecutive title and, ultimately, the sixth of eleven straight titles they won between 1987 and 1997.

Team results 
 Note: Top 10 only
 (H) = Hosts
Full results

Men's standings

Women's standings

Individual champions

Men's

100-meter 
Olapade Adeniken, UTEP, 10.09

200-meter 
Olapade Adeniken, UTEP, 20.11

400-meter 
Quincy Watts, USC, 44.00

800-meter 
Jose Parrilla, Tennessee, 1:46.45

1,500-meter 
Steve Holman, Georgetown, 3:38.39

3,000-meter Steeple Chase 
Marc Davis, Arizona, 8:36.79

5,000-meter 
Jon Dennis, South Florida, 14:02.40

10,000-meter 
Sean Dollman, Western Kentucky, 29:49.50

110-meter High Hurdles 
Mark Crear, USC, 13.49

400-meter Intermediate Hurdles 
Dan Steele, Eastern Illinois, 49.79

400-meter relay 
LSU (Reggie Jones, Bryant Williams, Chris King, Jason Sanders), 38.70

1,600-meter relay 
Georgia Tech (Octavius Terry, Julian Amede, Derrick Adkins, Derek Mills), 2:59.95

High Jump 
Darrin Plab, Southern Illinois,

Pole Vault 
Istvan Bagyula, George Mason,

Long Jump 
Erick Walder, Arkansas,

Triple Jump 
Brian Wellman, Arkansas,  (w)

Shot Put 
Brent Noon, Georgia,

Discus 
Kamy Keshmiri, Nevada,

Hammer Throw 
Mika Laaksonen, UTEP,

Javelin 
Art Skipper, Oregon,

Decathlon 
Brian Brophy, Tennessee, 8,276

Women's

100-meter 
Chryste Gaines, Stanford, 11.05 (w)

200-meter 
Dahlia Duhaney, LSU, 22.80

400-meter 
Anita Howard, Florida, 51.01

800-meter 
Nekita Beasley, Florida, 2:03.04

1,500-meter 
Sue Gentes, Wisconsin, 4:16.38

3,000-meter 
Nnenna Lynch, Villanova, 9:24.59

5,000-meter 
Monique Ecker, Oklahoma, 16:18.72

10,000-meter 
Kim Saddic, George Mason, 34:39.92

110-meter High Hurdles 
Michelle Freeman, Florida, 12.90

400-meter Intermediate Hurdles 
Tonja Buford, Illinois, 55.12

400-meter relay 
LSU (Dawn Bowles, Cheryl Taplin, Cinnamon Sheffield, Dahlia Duhaney), 43.03

1,600-meter relay 
Florida (Nekita Beasley, Michelle Freeman, Kim Mitchell, Anita Howard), 3:27.53

High Jump 
Tanya Hughes, Arizona,

Long Jump 
Jackie Edwards, Stanford,

Triple Jump 
Leah Kirklin, Florida,

Shot Put 
Katrin Koch, Indiana,

Discus 
Anna Mosdell, BYU,

Javelin 
Valerie Tulloch, Rice,

Heptathlon 
Anu Kaljurand, BYU, 6,142

References

NCAA Men's Outdoor Track and Field Championship
NCAA Division I Outdoor Track and Field Championships
NCAA
NCAA Division I Outdoor Track and Field Championships
NCAA Women's Outdoor Track and Field Championship